Christmastime is a studio album by Michael W. Smith. It was his second holiday-themed release, following 1989's Christmas.

Track listing

Personnel 

 Michael W. Smith – vocals (1–4, 6, 8, 10),  acoustic piano (3–7, 9–12), programming (3), arrangements (6, 7, 9, 10, 12), keyboards (11)
 Shane Keister – acoustic piano (1, 2, 8), orchestrations (8)
 Blair Masters – keyboards (11)
 Jerry Kimbrough – guitar (1, 2, 8)
 Phil Keaggy – guitars (7)
 David Hungate – bass (1, 2, 8)
 Leland Sklar – bass (6)
 Harold Jones – drums (1, 2, 8)
 Steve Brewster – drums (3)
 Paul Leim – drums (6)
 Eric Darken – percussion (7, 12)
 Mark Douthit – alto saxophone (2, 8)
 Sam Levine – alto saxophone (2, 8)
 Doug Moffett – tenor saxophone (2, 8)
 Denis Solee – tenor saxophone (2, 8)
 Ernie Collins – trombone (2, 8)
 Barry Green – trombone (2, 8)
 Chris McDonald – trombone (2, 8), horn arrangements (2, 8)
 Jeff Bailey – trumpet (2, 8)
 Mike Haynes – trumpet (2, 8)
 Steve Patrick – trumpet (2, 8)
 George Tidwell – trumpet (2, 8)
 Jerry O'Sullivan – Uilleann pipes (12), Highland pipes (12), tin whistle (12)
 Ronn Huff – orchestration (1, 2, 4, 5, 6)
 Tom Howard – orchestration (3, 10), choir arrangement (3, 10)
 Carl Marsh – orchestration (6, 7, 12)
 The London Session Orchestra – orchestra (1–8, 10, 12)
 Gavyn Wright – concertmaster 
 Mike Casteel – music copyist
 Stephen Danenberg – music copyist
 Ric Domenico – music copyist
 Wally Dunbar – music copyist
 Michael Goode – music copyist
 Tom McAninch – music copyist
 Lisa Cochran – backing vocals (2, 8)
 Tim Davis – backing vocals (2, 8), BGV arrangements (2, 8)
 Mark Ivey – backing vocals (2, 8)
 Amy Joy Weimer – backing vocals (2, 8)
 Chris Harris – backing vocals (6)
 Wayne Kirkpatrick – backing vocals (6)
 Chris Rodriguez – backing vocals (6)
 Lori Wilshire  – backing vocals (6)
 Sandi Patty – lead vocals (8)
 Anna Smith – vocal (10)
 The Hollywood Presbyterian Choir – adult choir (3, 6, 11)
 Fred Bock – Hollywood Presbyterian Choir director 
 The American Boyhood Choir – boychoir (3, 6, 10, 11)
 James Litton – American Boyhood Choir director 

Production

 Brown Bannister – producer for RBI Productions
 Michael W. Smith – co-producer
 Steve Bishir – engineer, mixing (4–7, 9, 11, 12)
 Hank Nirider – assistant engineer, mix assistant (11, 12)
 Charlie Warwick – assistant engineer
 Russ Long – additional engineer
 Gary Pacsoza – additional engineer
 Jess Sutcliffe – additional engineer
 East Iris Sound (Nashville, Tennessee) – recording location
 Deer Valley Studio (Franklin, Tennessee) – recording location
 Quad Studios (Nashville, Tennessee) – overdub recording location
 Sound Stage (Nashville, Tennessee) – overdub recording location
 Westlake D (Los Angeles, California) – recording location for Hollywood Presbyterian Choir
 Avatar Studios (New York City, New York) – recording location for American Boychoir
 Gaither Studios (Alexandria, Indiana) – vocal recording location for Sandi Patty
 Alex Marcou – orchestra recording engineer
 Douglas Blair – orchestra recording engineer
 Abbey Road Studios (London, England) – recording location for orchestra
 Mark Tucker – orchestra recording engineer
 Erik Jordan – orchestra recording engineer
 CTS Studios (Wembley, England) – recording location for orchestra
 Al Schmitt – mixing (1, 2, 8)
 Bill Smith – mix assistant (1, 2, 8)
 The Village Recorder (Los Angeles, California) – mixing location (1, 2, 8)
 Bill Deaton – mixing (3, 10)
 Fred Paragano – mix assistant (3, 10)
 Todd Gunnerson – mix assistant (4–7, 9)
 The Sound Kitchen (Franklin, Tennessee) – mixing location (3–7, 9, 10–12)
 Doug Sax – mastering at The Mastering Lab (Hollywood, California)
 Traci Sterling Bishir – production manager
 Diana Lussenden – art direction
 Ben Pearson – photography
 Janice Booker – design for Altar Ego Design

Chart performance

Weekly charts

Notes 

Michael W. Smith albums
1998 Christmas albums
Christmas albums by American artists
Reunion Records albums
Pop rock Christmas albums